Ludden Peak is a  mountain summit located within Olympic National Park in Jefferson County of Washington state. Ludden Peak is part of the Bailey Range, which is a subrange of the Olympic Mountains, and is set within the Daniel J. Evans Wilderness. In clear weather, the mountain can be seen from the park's visitor center on Hurricane Ridge. Precipitation runoff from the mountain drains into tributaries of the Elwha River.

Etymology
This peak was originally named "Mount Squire" by the 1889–90 Seattle Press Expedition after Watson Carvosso Squire, US Senator from the state of Washington. However, this geographical feature's name was officially adopted by the U.S. Board on Geographic Names to remember Addison "Doc" Ludden (1851–1927), an early pioneer of the Elwha Valley. Ludden had a mining claim and cabin near the peak. He was buried at Ocean View Cemetery in Port Angeles, Washington.

Climate

Based on the Köppen climate classification, Ludden Peak is located in the marine west coast climate zone of western North America. Most weather fronts originate in the Pacific Ocean, and travel east toward the Olympic Mountains. As fronts approach, they are forced upward by the peaks of the Olympic Range, causing them to drop their moisture in the form of rain or snowfall (Orographic lift). As a result, the Olympics experience high precipitation, especially during the winter months. During winter months, weather is usually cloudy, but, due to high pressure systems over the Pacific Ocean that intensify during summer months, there is often little or no cloud cover during the summer. The months June through October offer the most favorable weather for viewing and climbing.

Geology

The Olympic Mountains are composed of obducted clastic wedge material and oceanic crust, primarily Eocene sandstone, turbidite, and basaltic oceanic crust. The mountains were sculpted during the Pleistocene era by erosion and glaciers advancing and retreating multiple times. Ludden Peak is composed of hardened metaconglomerate.

Gallery

See also

 Olympic Mountains
 Geology of the Pacific Northwest

References

External links
 Doc Ludden: photo
 
 Weather forecast: Ludden Peak
 Doc Ludden's homestead in Elwha Valley: photo
 Doc Ludden's cabin: Wikimedia photo

Olympic Mountains
Mountains of Washington (state)
Landforms of Olympic National Park
North American 1000 m summits
Mountains of Jefferson County, Washington